Shalott most commonly refers to:
Shalott, an island in the poem The Lady of Shalott (1833 and 1842) by Alfred, Lord Tennyson
 "Shalott", a song on Emilie Autumn's album Opheliac (2006), based on Tennyson's poem

Shalott may be a misspelling of:
Shallot, a root vegetable similar to the onion

See also
The Lady of Shalott (painting), a 1888 painting by John William Waterhouse
The Lady of Shalott, a 1905 painting by William Holman Hunt